Sandra Amelia Ceballos Obaya (born March 21, 1961 in Guantánamo, Cuba) is a Cuban artist.

Exhibitions

Individual 
She has had many exhibitions, including:

 "Diálogo de Sandra y Manuel Vidal" in Galería L, Havana. (1985)
 "Special de Sandra y su marido" in Galería de Arte Domingo Ravenet. (1993)
 "La Expresión sicógena". and New Art from Cuba: Utopian Territories in Access Gallery, Vancouver, Canada. (1997) 
 "Mansas porciones" in Espacio Aglutinador, Havana, Cuba. (1998)

Collective
She was part of many collective exhibitions, including:

 I Bienal de Pintura Jaume Guasch. Fundació Jaume Guasch, Barcelona, Spain (1984)
 VIII Bienal Iberoamericana de Arte Domecq. "América nuestro Continente". Instituto Cultural Domecq, Mexico, D.F. (1992)
 1e Internationale Grafiek Biennale. Maastricht Exhibition and Congress Centre (MECC), Maastricht, Holland (1993) 
 "Una brecha entre el cielo y la tierra". fifth Bienal de La Habana. Centro Provincial de Artes Plásticas y Diseño, Havana, Cuba (1994) 
 V Bienal Internacional de Pintura de Cuenca. Museo Municipal de Arte Moderno, Cuenca, Ecuador, (1996)

Recognition
She has been granted many awards. Among them are:

 Mention of Painting. Salón Playa ’85, Galería de Arte Servando Cabrera Moreno, Havana. (1985)
 First Prize. Premio Nacional Anual de Pintura Contemporánea Juan Francisco Elso, Museo Nacional de Bellas Artes, Havana, Cuba.(1995)
 1990s Art from Cuba: A National Residency and Exhibition Program. Art in General and Longwood Art Project/Bronx Council on the Arts, New York City. (1997)
 Title Residence in the Design and Films Institute, Switzerland. (1998)

Collections
Her works can be found in collections such as:
The Center for Cuban Studies, New York City.
The Museo de Arte Moderno, Michoacán, Morelia, Mexico.
The Museo Nacional de Bellas Artes, Havana, Cuba, and in
The Museo Universitario del Chopo, México, D.F., Mexico.

References
Viegas, Jose; Memoria: Artes Visuales Cubanas Del Siglo Xx; (California International Arts 2004);   
Veigas-Zamora, Jose ; Vives Gutierrez, Cristina ; Nodal, Adolfo V.; Garzon, Valia and Montes de Oca, Dannys; Memoria: Cuban Art of the 20th Century; (California/International Arts Foundation 2001);

External links
 Women Beyond Borders
 Galeria Cuba Arte

1961 births
Living people
20th-century Cuban women artists
21st-century Cuban women artists
Cuban contemporary artists
People from Guantánamo
Cuban painters
Cuban women painters